Zanjan University of Medical Sciences is a public medical sciences university located in Zanjan, Iran.

See also
 Zanjan University
 Institute for Advanced Studies in Basic Sciences

References

External links
 Scientific information database
 Journal Of Zanjan University Of Medical Sciences And Health Services

Universities in Iran
Medical schools in Iran
Zanjan County
Educational institutions established in 1987
1987 establishments in Iran
Education in Zanjan Province
Buildings and structures in Zanjan Province